"I Don't Think, I Know" is a pop country song written by Brooke McClymont and Clive Young, produced by Charles Fisher for McClymont's second single released in Australia on 2 December 2002 as a CD single. It became McClymont's highest selling solo single to date peaking at number forty-five on the Australian ARIA Singles Chart and spending fourteen weeks in the top one hundred.

Track listing
"I Don't Think, I Know" – 3:35
"I Don't Think, I Know" (re-mix) – 3:15
"I Don't Think, I Know" (acoustic) – 3:47
"Take You with Me" – 4:28

Charts

References

2002 singles
Songs written by Brooke McClymont